En vivo 1993 Argentina is the first live album of Argentine heavy metal band Hermética, self-released in 1993. 

It was recorded on May 15, 1993 at "Stadium", a venue in Buenos Aires.

A video version of the album (VHS) was also commercialized.

Track listing
All songs written and composed by Ricardo Iorio, except where noted.

Personnel
 Ricardo Iorio - Bass, vocals 
 Claudio O'Connor - Lead vocals
 Antonio Romano - Guitar
 Claudio Strunz - Drums

References

Hermética albums
Live thrash metal albums
1993 live albums
Live albums recorded in Buenos Aires